The Augusta Colts were a professional indoor football team based in Augusta, Georgia.  The team played their home games at the James Brown Arena.

History

The Colts originally began in 2006 as the Augusta Spartans of the American Indoor Football League.  After a mediocre season, they played in the World Indoor Football League in 2007.  During the year, the Spartans went 8–6, defeated the Osceola Ghostriders in the opening round of the playoffs, and won the World Indoor Bowl over the Columbus Lions. Wide receiver Marvin Stone was named the 2007 league MVP and received the Javan Camon Award.

For the 2008, the team moved back to the renamed American Indoor Football Association and renamed themselves the Augusta Colts.

In a press release, it was announced that the Colts would sit out the 2009 season, but planned to return for the 2010 season. Another press release then reported that for the 2010 season, the Colts would join the Southern Indoor Football League.

On November 16, 2009, a group of investors held a press conference with John Sisson saying that they had purchased the team.  However, on December 5, 2009, the deal could not be reached and the group deciding to start a new team in Augusta as a member of the SIFL. The Colts were suspended indefinitely.

Season-by-season 

|-
| colspan="6" align="center" |  Augusta Spartans (AIFL)
|-
|2006 || 5 || 9 || 0 || 6th Southern || —
|-
| colspan="6" align="center" | Augusta Spartans (WIFL)
|-
|2007 || 8 || 6 || 0 || 2nd League || Won Opening Round (Osceola) Won World Indoor Bowl I (Columbus)
|-
| colspan="6" align="center" |  Augusta Colts (AIFA)
|-
|2008 || 7 || 7 || 0 || 3rd WC Southern || —
|-
!Totals || 22 || 22 || 0
|colspan="2"| (including playoffs)

References

External links
 Official website
 Augusta Colts' Myspace page
 Colts' 2008 stats
 Spartans change to the Colts — The Aiken Standard

American Indoor Football Association teams
American Indoor Football League teams
Southern Indoor Football League teams
Sports in Augusta, Georgia
2006 establishments in Georgia (U.S. state)
2008 disestablishments in Georgia (U.S. state)
American football teams established in 2006
American football teams disestablished in 2008
American football teams in Georgia (U.S. state)